Trios / Solos is an album by American jazz guitarist Ralph Towner with Glen Moore.

Reception 
At AllMusic, critic Thom Jurek gave the album four stars, stating, "While Trios/Solos has its moments of pure unadulterated noodling yawn, there are more than enough dimensions where the four elements meet and spark to compensate".

Track listing

Personnel 
 Ralph Towner — twelve-string guitar, classical guitar, piano (tracks 1-4 & 6-9)
 Glen Moore — bass (tracks 1, 3, 5, 6 & 8)
 Paul McCandless — oboe (tracks 3 & 8)
 Colin Walcott — tabla (track 1)

References 

ECM Records albums
Ralph Towner albums
1973 debut albums
Albums produced by Manfred Eicher